The manga series Higurashi: When They Cry comprises 14 separate story arcs written by Ryukishi07 and illustrated by several different manga artists working separately on one or more story arcs primarily based on the Higurashi no Naku Koro ni visual novel series by 07th Expansion. The first manga, an adaptation of Onikakushi-hen, is illustrated by Karin Suzuragi and was serialized in the Square Enix's Gangan Powered between the May 2005 and May 2006 issues. Suzuragi also draws the manga adaptation of Tsumihoroboshi-hen, which was serialized in Gangan Powered between the August 2006 and June 2008 issues, and Matsuribayashi-hen, which started serialization in Gangan Powered in the August 2008 issue. When Gangan Powered was discontinued with the April 2009 issue, Matsuribayashi-hen was transferred to Square Enix's Gangan Joker with the May 2009 inaugural issue, and ran until the May 2011 issue. Suzuragi's also drew the manga adaptation of Saikoroshi-hen, which was serialized between the July and December 2011 issues of Gangan Joker.

Yutori Hōjō illustrated the adaptations of Watanagashi-hen, which was serialized Square Enix's Gangan Wing between the June 2005 and May 2006 issues, and Meakashi-hen, which was serialized in Gangan Wing between the August 2006 and April 2008 issues. Jirō Suzuki illustrates the adaptation of Tatarigoroshi-hen, which was serialized in Square Enix's GFantasy between the June 2005 and June 2006 issues. Yoshiki Tonogai illustrates the adaptation of Himatsubushi-hen, which was serialized in Square Enix's Monthly Shōnen Gangan between the February and November 2006 issues. Hanase Momoyama illustrated the adaptation of Minagoroshi-hen, which was serialized in GFantasy between the July 2008 and July 2010 issues. Rechi Kazuki illustrates the adaptation of Hirukowashi-hen, which was serialized in Square Enix's Gangan Online between March 26 and September 24, 2009. In addition to the main series, there are four side stories related to the main Higurashi story, but with new characters. The first, named , is drawn by En Kitō and was serialized in Comp Ace between the May 2005 and November 2006 issues. The next, titled , is drawn by Mimori and was serialized in GFantasy between the July 2006 and August 2007 issues. Another manga titled  is also drawn by Kitō and was serialized in Comp Ace between the February and August 2007 issues. The last side-story, is drawn by Yuna Kagesaki and was serialized Kadokawa Shoten's Comp Ace between the October 2008 and April 2009 issues.

The chapters for the question arcs, Onikakushi-hen, Watanagashi-hen, Tatarigoroshi-hen, and Himatsubushi-hen were collected into two bound volumes each between December 2005 and December 2006 in Japan. The first two answer arcs, Meakashi-hen and Tsumihoroboshi-hen, were collected into four volumes each. Onisarashi-hen and Yoigoshi-hen were collected into two volumes each released in Japan between April 2006 and August 2007. Utsutsukowashi-hen was released in a single volume in December 2007 in Japan, and a single volume of Kokoroiyashi-hen was released in March 2009. Hirukowashi-hen was published in a single volume in December 2009. In total, 38 volumes have been released over the entire series. Yen Press licensed the manga series at New York Comic Con 2008 under the title Higurashi When They Cry for release in English in North America. The manga was initially serialized in Yen Press' Yen Plus anthology magazine, the first issue of which went on sale on July 29, 2008. The first English volume of the manga was originally planned to be sold in early 2009, but was released in November 2008.

Volume list

Abducted by Demons Arc (Onikakushi-hen)

Cotton Drifting Arc (Watanagashi-hen)

Curse Killing Arc (Tatarigoroshi-hen)

Time Killing Arc (Himatsubushi-hen)

Beyond Midnight Arc (Yoigoshi-hen)

Eye Opening Arc (Meakashi-hen)

Atonement Arc (Tsumihoroboshi-hen)

Massacre Arc (Minagoroshi-hen)

Festival Accompanying Arc (Matsuribayashi-hen)

Dice Killing Arc (Saikoroshi-hen)

Demon Exposing Arc (Onisarashi-hen)

Currently Destroyed Arc (Utsutsukowashi-hen)

Healing Heart Arc (Kokoroiyashi-hen)

Daytime Breakdown Arc (Hirukowashi-hen)

Gou

Meguri

References

External links
Higurashi manga  at Square Enix 
Higurashi manga  at Yen Press

Chapters
Lists of manga volumes and chapters